The 2012 Queensland state election was held on 24 March 2012 to elect all 89 members of the Legislative Assembly, a unicameral parliament.

The Labor Party (ALP), led by Premier Anna Bligh, was defeated by the opposition Liberal National Party (LNP), led by Campbell Newman in a landslide victory. It is only the sixth time that Queenslanders have ousted a sitting government since 1915. The ALP was attempting to win a ninth consecutive election victory, having won every general election since 1989, despite being out of office between 1996 and 1998. Katter's Australian Party contested its first election. Before the election, it held two seats whose members had been elected as LNP candidates.

Labor suffered one of the worst defeats of a state government since Federation, and the worst defeat of a sitting government in Queensland history. From 51 seats in 2009, it was reduced to only seven seats, suffering a swing of 15.6 percentage points.  The LNP won a majority for the first time in its history, jumping from 34 to 78 seats to win the largest majority government in Queensland history. It was the first outright non-Labor majority since the Queensland Nationals won their last victory in 1986. Katter's Australian Party won two seats, though leader Aidan McLindon lost his own seat.  The remaining two seats were taken by independents.  Newman took office two days after the election.

Historically, Queenslanders have given their governments long tenures in office. The 2012 election marked only the sixth change of government in the state since 1915.

Results 

The estimated two-party preferred result was 37.2% for Labor and 62.8% for the LNP, a swing of 13.7% from Labor's result of 2009.

The LNP had been unbackable favourites to win the election.  By the time the writs were issued, they had led opinion polling for over a year, and had been ahead of Labor on all but one Newspoll since 2010.

The LNP swept Labor from power in a massive landslide, taking 78 seats to Labor's seven on a two-party-preferred swing of 13.7 points away from Labor.  The 44-seat loss is double the 22-seat loss suffered by the Nationals in the 1989 election, the previous record for the worst defeat of a sitting government in Queensland history.  The 13.7-percent swing is one of the largest against a sitting state government in Australia since World War II.

In the process, the LNP won many seats considered Labor heartland. It broke Labor's longstanding grip on Brisbane, taking all but three of the city's 40 seats, some on swings of 10 points or more.  By comparison, Labor went into the election holding all but six seats in the capital, which had been its power base for over 20 years. In every election since the "one vote, one value" reforms of the Goss government, Labor had won at least 30 seats in Brisbane. The LNP also won every seat on the Gold Coast while strengthening its hold on its traditional heartlands in provincial and rural Queensland. Ten members of Bligh's cabinet were defeated. Newman won Ashgrove handily, defeating Labor's Kate Jones on a 13-point swing, almost double the 7-point swing he needed to take the seat off Labor.

ABC News called the election for the LNP at 6:48 pm Queensland time, less than an hour after counting began.  Bligh conceded defeat at 8:25 pm, and Newman publicly claimed victory 20 minutes later.

The day after the election, Bligh resigned as premier and Queensland Labor leader.  She also announced she was resigning from parliament on 30 March and retiring from politics, triggering a by-election in her seat of South Brisbane. An hour later, Newman, who at the time did not know that Bligh had resigned, announced that he would be sworn in as premier on 26 March, heading an interim three-man cabinet composed of himself, Seeney and Tim Nicholls.  Although Newman's victory was beyond doubt, counting was still under way in some seats. Bligh handed in her resignation later on the afternoon of 25 March, but remained as caretaker until Newman was sworn in the next day.

Labor was reduced to its smallest presence in the legislature on record, outdoing its previous low in 1974, when it was cut down to a "cricket team" of only 11 members at the height of Joh Bjelke-Petersen's power. Indeed, Michael Madigan of The Courier-Mail wrote that Labor had been reduced to a "water polo squad."

Although Labor came up two seats short of official party status in the legislature, Newman promised that Labor would be "properly resourced as an opposition".

| colspan=7 |* The two-party preferred summary is an estimate by Antony Green using a methodology by Malcolm Mackerras.
|}

Seats changing hands 
Labor lost 44 seats, all but one to the LNP. Katter's Australia Party took the other, but lost its leader's seat to the LNP, which also gained three seats formerly held by independents.

Candidates listed in italics did not contest their seat at this election.

1 Aidan McLindon was elected as a member of the LNP in 2009, but he quit the party to form the Queensland Party in 2010, then merged his party with Katter's Australian Party in 2011.
2 Rob Messenger was elected as a member of the LNP in 2009, but quit the party to become an independent in 2010.

Post-election pendulum

Voting method 
At the time, Queensland used optional preferential version of the instant-runoff system in single-member electorates. The election was conducted by the Electoral Commission of Queensland, an independent body answerable to Parliament.

Leadership of the Liberal National Party 
Campbell Newman was elected leader of the LNP in early 2011 while he was the Lord Mayor of Brisbane. Standard practice calls for an MP from a safe seat to resign so that a newly elected leader can get into parliament via a by-election, though this is not universally followed. However, when Newman won the leadership in 2011, a by-election could not be arranged. For this reason, Jeff Seeney was elected as interim parliamentary leader of the LNP and Leader of the Opposition. Newman led the LNP election team from outside of parliament, often sitting at the galleries, and simultaneously contested the seat of Ashgrove as the LNP candidate.

Date 
At the time in Queensland, a parliamentary term was a maximum of three years, measured from the day set for the return of the electoral writs. The previous state election was held on 21 March 2009 to elect the 89 members of the Legislative Assembly.

Section 80 of the Queensland Electoral Act 1992 states that an election must be held on a Saturday; and that the election campaign must run for a minimum of 26 or a maximum of 56 days following the issue of the writs. Five to seven days following the issue of the writs, the electoral roll is closed, which gives voters a final opportunity to enroll or to notify the Electoral Commission of Queensland of any changes in their place of residence.

The Constitution Act Amendment Act 1890 provides that the Legislative Assembly continues for (up to) three years from the day set for the return of writs for the previous election, after which time the Legislative Assembly lapses. The day set for the return of writs for the 2009 election was 20 April 2009. The Electoral Act requires the Governor to issue writs for a general election "not later than 4 days after the day on which the Legislative Assembly is dissolved or expires by the passage of time" (section 78(2)). The last possible day for the next election was therefore a Saturday not more than 56 days beyond four days after the expiry of the Legislative Assembly on 24 April 2012, namely, 16 June 2012.

In choosing 24 March, Bligh made the unusual step of announcing the election date two months prior. Bligh was criticised for selecting a date which required the postponement of local government elections. Bligh has said that date allowed Queenslanders to view the final report of the Commission of Inquiry into the 2010–11 Queensland floods before they vote. Normal practice in Australia is for parliament to be dissolved at the time of the election announcement.  However, Bligh did not formally ask Governor Penelope Wensley to dissolve Parliament until 19 February.  Wensley granted the request, formally beginning the 35-day campaign. By not asking for a dissolution in January, Bligh avoided placing the government in caretaking mode for 25 days.

Key dates

Retiring MPs 
The following Members of Parliament stood down at the election:

Labor QLD 
 Julie Attwood (Mount Ommaney) – announced 16 January 2012
 Desley Boyle (Cairns) – announced 17 February 2011
 Paul Lucas (Lytton) – announced 15 September 2011
 Carolyn Male (Pine Rivers) – announced 3 February 2012
 John Mickel (Logan) – announced 10 August 2011
 Lindy Nelson-Carr (Mundingburra) – announced 28 March 2011
 Neil Roberts (Nudgee) – announced 12 December 2011
 Stephen Robertson (Stretton) – announced 27 March 2011
 Robert Schwarten (Rockhampton) – announced 17 February 2011
 Judy Spence (Sunnybank) – announced 15 December 2010

LNP 
 Mike Horan (Toowoomba South) – announced 26 March 2011

Independent 
 Dorothy Pratt (Nanango) – announced 15 April 2011

Contesting parties 
A total of six Queensland registered political parties contested the election. The two major parties, the ALP and LNP (each contesting all 89 seats), The Greens (89 seats), Katter's Australian Party (76 seats), Family First (38 seats) and One Nation (6 seats). In addition to the above parties, 43 Independent or non-aligned candidates contested the election. Of the 43 candidates, several contested on behalf of unregistered parties, namely: Socialist Alliance (3 seats), North Queensland Party (3 seats), Queensland Party (2 seats), Democratic Labor Party (1 seat) and Middle Australian Party (1 seat).

Disendorsed candidates 
The Liberal National Party disendorsed two candidates for the Gold Coast seat of Broadwater. Richard Townson was caught drink driving with a blood alcohol content of 0.07 when he was in a police random breath test. Cameron Caldwell was disendorsed when he confirmed he had attended a Gold Coast swingers' club.

The Australian Labor Party disendorsed candidate Peter Watson for the seat of Southern Downs and expelled him from the party for making racist and homophobic remarks online.

Katter appeal on ballot papers 
On 2 March 2012, Katter's Australian Party sought an injunction in the Supreme Court of Queensland to have more than 2 million ballot papers shredded and reprinted. The party said the Queensland Electoral Commission used the party's abbreviated name, "The Australian Party", instead of its registered name, "Katter's Australian Party (Qld Division)", which the party claimed could confuse voters. Bligh said that her lawyers had advised her to reschedule the election if Katter's challenge succeeded.

On 7 March, Supreme Court Justice Roslyn Atkinson referred the matter to the Queensland Court of Appeal as matters of constitutional law in the case were outside her jurisdiction. The Court of Appeal rejected the constitutional arguments and dismissed the appeal the following day.

Polling 
Newspoll and Galaxy polling was conducted via random telephone number selection in city and country areas. Sampling sizes usually consist of around 800-1000 electors, with the declared margin of error at around ±3 percent.

Graphical summary

Better Premier and leadership approval graphical summary

Newspaper endorsements

See also 

 Candidates of the 2012 Queensland state election
 Politics of Queensland

References

External links 
 Electoral Commission Queensland
 2012 Queensland election – Antony Green ABC
 A map of state electoral divisions in Queensland, courtesy of Courier Mail
 Post-election pendulum: Antony Green ABC

Elections in Queensland
2012 elections in Australia
2010s in Queensland
March 2012 events in Australia
Landslide victories